The Shropshire County Premier Football League was an English association football league based in the county of Shropshire. The league, usually known as the Shropshire County League, was founded in 1950 and in the final season had two divisions which sat at levels 13 and 14 of the English football league system. It was dissolved in May 2012 and all member clubs transferred to a new, larger Mercian Regional Football League for the 2012–13 season.

Clubs who won this league were promoted to the West Midlands (Regional) League (all champions 2008–2012 were), although on occasion teams (such as Shifnal Town in 1993) instead moved into the Midland Football Combination. The champions of the 2011–12 season – the final season for the league – were Newport Town.

Teams from the Telford Combination were sometimes promoted into the league, as Impact United did in 2008 and Ketley Bank United in 2009. Teams from the Shropshire Alliance were also able to be promoted into the league, as Rock Rovers did in 2011, however the Alliance folded with its last season being 2010–11.

The grounds of several teams in the league, most notably Brown Clee, were featured in David Bauckham's book Dugouts, which noted the high frequency of dugouts with lockable doors which are also used for storage, a feature seemingly unique to clubs in Shropshire.

All scores of the league's Saturday afternoon games were read out on BBC Radio Shropshire, around an hour after full-time.

2011–12 season

Premier Division
A total of 14 teams took part in the Premier Division in the 2011–12 season, an increase of two from the previous season. 2010–11 champions Haughmond had been promoted to the West Midlands (Regional) League, no team had been relegated from the Premier Division, while 3 teams had come up from Division One: Wellington Amateurs Reserves, Church Stretton Town and Whitchurch Alport Reserves.

Morda United won the Premier Division Cup, beating Ludlow 3–0 in the final.

Division One
With the demise of the Shropshire Alliance football league, a total of six teams transferred from the Alliance to the County League: Hopesgate United, Ludlow Town Reserves (they played in the Alliance as Ludlow Town Colts), Oswestry Lions, Prees United, Rock Rovers (2010–11 Alliance champions) and Weston Rhyn. Further, a reserve team of Shawbury United were formed and joined the County League in this division, and Wrockwardine Wood Juniors were promoted from the Shropshire Minor League (they played previously as Oakengates Rangers U18) skipping the Telford Combination. Atlas changed their name to Allscott, and completed the season as the division champions.

The number of teams in Division One therefore increased from 11 in the previous season to 16. With the large number of teams in the division, the Division One Cup and the Ron Jones Memorial Cup competitions did not take place this season.

†Began the season playing at RAF Shawbury's "Dawsons Rough" pitch, but moved to Springfield in October 2011.

2010–11 season

Premier Division
Haughmond were the Shropshire County Premier Football League Champions 2010–11 (the side came 2nd in the previous season), and the side also won the Ron Jones Memorial Cup. By chance the final match of the season took place between the teams at first and second place (Haughmond and Ellesmere Rangers Reserves) and decided the League Champion. Ludlow Town came third in the league, while Dawley Villa finished bottom with just 9 points. FC Hodnet won the Premier Division Cup, beating Haughmond in the final.

Ludlow Town joined the County League this season, having voluntarily dropped three levels from the West Midlands (Regional) League's Premier Division, because of financial difficulties.

Division One
Wellington Amateurs Reserves were the Division One 2010–11 season champions, while Church Stretton Town came second, and Clee Hill United finished bottom with just 7 points. Wellington also won the Division One Cup, beating Bishop's Castle in the final.

League champions

Shropshire Alliance

The Shropshire Alliance was a football league for Shropshire-based teams that ran from the mid-1970s to 2011. It was formed by the merger of the Shrewsbury and West Shropshire Leagues, which were formed in the late 1940s. At its height it comprised three divisions, but the number of teams fell and by the end of the 2010–11 season only 8 teams remained. It was decided in 2011 to fold the league, and 6 of the member teams came over to the Shropshire County League (one of which, Rock Rovers, were the final season's champions and would have been promoted to the County League in any case). The 2010–11 season was therefore the final season. Being a feeder to the County League, the Shropshire Alliance was effectively at level 15 of the English football pyramid.

See also
Mercian Regional Football League
Shropshire Football Association
Shropshire#Football

References

 
Football in Shropshire
Defunct football leagues in England
Sports leagues established in 1950
1950 establishments in England
Recurring events disestablished in 2012
2012 disestablishments in England